The South West Community Development Council is one of five Community Development Councils (CDCs) set up across the Republic of Singapore to aid in local administration of governmental policies and schemes. They are funded in part by the government although they are free to engage in fund-raising activities.

The South West Community Development Council (CDC) was formed on 24 November 2001. Spanning the south-western region of Singapore, covering a third of its land area. The District has about 220,000 households with over 750,000 residents. The District has a characteristically high concentration of industrial estates, including the Jurong Islands and Tuas area.

Constituencies
As of March 2020, the South West district covers:

Single Member Constituency (SMC)
Bukit Batok SMC
Hong Kah North SMC
Pioneer SMC
Yuhua SMC

Group Representation Constituency (GRC)
Chua Chu Kang GRC
Brickland
Bukit Gombak
Chua Chu Kang
Keat Hong
Jurong GRC
Jurong Central
Jurong Spring
Taman Jurong
Clementi
Bukit Batok East
West Coast GRC
Ayer Rajah-Gek Poh
Boon Lay
Nanyang
Telok Blangah
West Coast

Mayors
The incumbent Mayor of South West District is Low Yen Ling of Chua Chu Kang GRC since 2014.

References

External links
 South West Community Development Council

Districts of Singapore
Boon Lay
Bukit Batok
Choa Chu Kang
Clementi
Jurong East
Bukit Merah
2001 establishments in Singapore
Organizations established in 2001